The Alvor massacre took place in June 1189 during the Third Crusade, when a fleet of crusaders from the Holy Roman Empire, Denmark and the County of Flanders stormed the castle of Alvor in the Algarve, then part of the Almohad Caliphate, and massacred 5,600 people. The place of the conquest and massacre of Alvor in the Portuguese Reconquista is unclear, but there are grounds for thinking that it was part of the strategy of King Sancho I, who launched a siege of Silves a month later.

Sources
The event is briefly mentioned in several sources, the most important being the anonymous Account of the Seaborne Journey by a crusader from northern Germany on a later expedition, whose mention takes up seven lines in the manuscript. The only other contemporary source to directly mention the Alvor massacre is the Royal Chronicle of Cologne. Another contemporary source, the Annals of Lambertus Parvus, is probably referring to the Alvor expedition when it recounts how a fleet of northerner crusaders gathered in England and "many battles … joined with the pagans" in the Iberian Peninsula on their way to the East. The only Arabic source that refers to the loss of Alvor is the Bayān al-mughrib of Ibn ʿIdhārī, based on contemporary sources. It refers to Alvor as "the port", a reference to its classical name, Portus Hannibalis. It records that the crusaders "dealt death to all that were in it, great and small, men and women."

There is confusion in some later sources, such as the Itinerary of the Pilgrims and Deeds of King Richard and the Chronicle of Robert of Auxerre, between the sack of Alvor and the capture of Silves. Robert's account found its way into the chronicle of William of Nangis and the Chronicle of Tours. The memory of the Alvor massacre was erroneously transferred to the conquest of Silves in Robert's account, where "no age was spared, and both sexes equally were slaughtered." He has 50 ships from Frisia and Denmark joining with the 37 crusader ships that actually attacked Silves. Ibn ʿIdhārī mentions the massacre after the fall of Silves in his narrative.

Expedition
In February 1189, fifty or more ships carrying perhaps 12,000 men sailed from Frisia. At the mouth of the Rhine, they joined with another fleet consisting of crusaders from the Rhineland, Holland and Flanders. From there, they sailed to Dartmouth, joining further squadrons of English and Flemish ships. According to Lambertus, the fleet had 55 ships and contained Danes, Flemings, Frisians and men from Cologne and Liège.

The Royal Chronicle records that the fleet set sail during Lent. Ten days after setting out, it stopped in Galicia. At that time it contained 60 ships of various origins with "10,000 fighting men and more." The crusaders attempted to visit the shrine of Saint James at Compostela. A rumour spread that they intended to steal James's relics and there was fighting between the pilgrims and the townspeople resulting in fatalities on both sides before, "through wise men intervening," the crusaders agreed to return to their ships. The fleet then stopped in Lisbon before attacking Alvor, as recorded in the Seaborne Journey:

To this account of the massacre, the Royal Chronicle adds the detail that they "captured endless amounts of silver and gold." After the sack, the men of Cologne chose to remain in Portugal while the rest of the expedition continued eastward. Lambertus confirms that the fleet eventually joined the siege of Acre. It is the fleet that arrives on 1 September in the account of Arnold of Lübeck and is also mentioned by Ralph of Coggeshall. The Itinerary of the Pilgrims records its arrival, but conflates it with the fleet that captured Silves and mistakenly transplants the massacre to that city.

The leaders of the fleet that sacked Alvor are unnamed in any source. The crusaders seem mainly to have been commoners. The event cannot be dated more precisely than to the month of June. Neither is it clear how long it took to reduce Alvor. It was probably stormed, since the chronology leaves no room for a lengthy siege. Following the capture of Silves, Sancho I granted Alvor to the monastery of Santa Cruz.

Place in the Reconquista
No source states explicitly that the crusaders who attacked Alvor were acting in agreement with Portugal, but it is likely that they were. The fleet was in Lisbon prior to the sack and was accompanied as far as the Straits of Gibraltar by some Portuguese galleys. Moreover, the sack of Alvor was of strategic value for King Sancho I's impending attack on Silves.

The massacre at Alvor was exceptional in the Portuguese Reconquista. The normal policy was to encourage Muslim populations to remain to keep the land under cultivation and to pay taxes to the king. The indiscriminate massacre shocked contemporaries. The sack of Alvor is unrecorded in medieval Portuguese historiography, possibly it was even suppressed. In the account of Sancho I's reign in the Chronicle of 1419, the capture of Silves is recounted in detail, but Alvor is not mentioned.

Alvor was retaken by the Almohads during their campaign of 1191.

Notes

Bibliography

12th century in Portugal
Battles involving the Almohad Caliphate
Battles of the Third Crusade
1189 in Europe
Conflicts in 1189
12th-century massacres
Massacres in Portugal